This is a list of state prisons in Alabama. It does not include federal prisons or county jails located in the state of Alabama.

Major facilities

Work releases, work centers, and camps 

 Alex City Work Release Center
 Atmore Work Release Center (CLOSED)
 Birmingham Work Release Center
 Bullock Work Release Center
 Camden Work Release Center
 Childersburg Boot & Work Camp
 Childersburg Work Release Center
 Davis Correctional Facility
 Decatur Work Release Center (RENAMED - North Alabama Work Release Center)
 Elba Work Release Center
 Farquhar Cattle Ranch
 Frank Lee Youth Center
 Hamilton Work Release Center
 Loxley Community Work Camp
 Loxley Work Release Center
 Mobile Work Release Center
 Montgomery Women's Facility
 Red Eagle Honor Farm

Former
 Wetumpka State Penitentiary, established in 1841 as the Alabama State Penitentiary

See also

External links
 Alabama Department of Corrections

 
Alabama
Penal system in Alabama
Prisons